The first episode of the seventh season on All That featured special guests Frankie Muniz and Aaron Carter and aired on January 19, 2002. This season ran from January 19, 2002, to May 4, 2002, with 13 episodes aired, the fewest out of all the other seasons. The season was taped from August to December 2001.

Many changes happened to the show before the start of this season. The entire cast of the previous season left the show. Nickelodeon replaced them with new cast members, who would bring in fresh material. The new cast included Chelsea Brummet, Jack DeSena, Lisa Foiles, Bryan Hearne, Shane Lyons, Giovonnie Samuels and Kyle Sullivan. Of the cast, Brummet, DeSena, Foiles and Sullivan would remain on the show for the entire reboot period from 2002 to 2005, similar to original cast member, Josh Server remaining present for the entire original period from 1994 to 2000.

Other changes occurred before the start of the season as well. The show got rid of the long-running sketch Vital Information, which had been featured in every show since the second episode of the first season, but resumed in season 10 with Lil' JJ as host. It was replaced with a new sketch called Know Your Stars, which was featured in almost every episode of this season and onward. The show also got rid of the traditional green room, where the cast would hang out. In this season, the cast would be featured walking around the studio instead of being in one area. Another change was the absence of Kevin Kopelow, the stage manager who was usually hurt in some way. He was replaced with Pickle Boy, a random person who would usually be seen offering people pickles.

In conjunction with the seventh season, All That brought in weekly special guest stars who helped open the show and participated in some of the sketches. Some included: Melissa Joan Hart, Frankie Muniz, Tony Hawk, David Arquette, Britney Spears, Aaron Carter, Will Friedle, Christina Vidal, Matthew Lillard, Ray Romano, Alexa Vega and Daryl Sabara (Spy Kids), Nick Carter, Justin Timberlake, Buddy Hackett, Barry Watson, Jennifer Love Hewitt, Tom Green, and former Guiding Light star Brittany Snow. Former cast members Kenan Thompson and Amanda Bynes also guest starred and reprised some of their characters. Also, during this season there was supposed to be a scheduled performance by singer Aaliyah but due to her death the performance was made by a different musical guest.

The new cast also debuted with a new intro. Unlike the first six seasons, the audience wasn't featured in a camera shot before the intro. The intro did, however, include the "Oh" sign, as in past seasons. The intro featured the cast dancing in front of a large lighted All That logo. They are all wearing white. Their names appear on the bottom of the screen and are in bright red lettering. After Sullivan is shown, the intro cuts to the cast dancing again before showing the host and the musical guest. The intro ends with the cast walking into camera shot, while all the lights go off.

Cast
Repertory players

 Chelsea Brummet
 Jack DeSena
 Lisa Foiles
 Bryan Hearne
 Shane Lyons
 Giovonnie Samuels
 Kyle Sullivan

Episodes

References

External links

2002 American television seasons
All That seasons